Sven Gavelin (1909-1991) was Swedish geologist active at Stockholms högskola and the Geological Survey of Sweden. As a geologist he worked chiefly with Precambrian events and rocks. Sven Gavelin made significant contributions to the understanding of the ore deposits of Västerbotten. Some other topics he investigated include the Almesåkra Group,

He was the son of Axel Gavelin, who was also a geologist. Sven Gavelin was also a member of the Royal Physiographic Society in Lund and the Royal Swedish Academy of Sciences.

1909 births
1991 deaths
20th-century Swedish geologists
Economic geologists
Petrologists
Members of the Royal Physiographic Society in Lund
Members of the Royal Swedish Academy of Sciences
Geological Survey of Sweden personnel